Christer Johansson (born 11 November 1950 in Bjurholm, Västerbotten) was a former Swedish cross-country skier who competed in the 1970s. He earned a gold medal in the 4 × 10 km relay at the 1978 FIS Nordic World Ski Championships in Lahti. He also participated at the 1976 Winter Olympics in Innsbruck with a 21st place on the 30 km and a fourth place in the 4 × 10 km relay.

Cross-country skiing results

Olympic Games

World Championships
 1 medal – (1 gold)

References

External links
World Championship results 

1950 births
Living people
People from Bjurholm Municipality
Cross-country skiers from Västerbotten County
Swedish male cross-country skiers
Cross-country skiers at the 1976 Winter Olympics
Olympic cross-country skiers of Sweden
FIS Nordic World Ski Championships medalists in cross-country skiing
20th-century Swedish people